The Cheyenne Cyclone is a 1931 American Western film directed by Armand Schaefer and starring Lane Chandler, Marie Quillan and Frankie Darro. It is a remake of the 1928 silent film Phantom of the Range.

Main cast
 Lane Chandler as Bob Carleton 
 Marie Quillan as Patsy O'Brien 
 Frankie Darro as 'Orphan' McGuire 
 Jay Hunt as Patrick O'Brien 
 J. Frank Glendon as Dan Fanning 
 Connie Lamont as Genevieve - the Actress 
 Edward Hearn as J.C. 'Flash' Corbin 
 Henry Roquemore as Harrison - the Actor 
 Slim Whitaker as Hank - Henchman
 Yakima Canutt as Ed Brady
 Helen Gibson as Townswoman
 Hank Bell as Sheriff

Plot
Carleton and Genevieve are actors who become stranded in a western town. Carleton finds work at a ranch, where he helps the owner and his granddaughter defend their enterprise against cattle rustlers. Carleton captures the culprits by the film's end.

Production 
In addition to Schaefer as director, Willis Kent was the producer. Ethel Davey was the editor, Oliver Drake was the screenwriter, and William Nobles was the cinematographer. The film was made on location at Lone Pine, California.

References

Bibliography
 Michael R. Pitts. Poverty Row Studios, 1929–1940: An Illustrated History of 55 Independent Film Companies, with a Filmography for Each. McFarland & Company, 2005.

External links
 

1931 films
1931 Western (genre) films
American Western (genre) films
Films directed by Armand Schaefer
Films shot in Lone Pine, California
1930s English-language films
1930s American films